Mario Sánchez Ruiz (born 17 November 1961) is a Mexican former politician. As of 2013 he served as Deputy of the LXII Legislature of the Mexican Congress representing Sonora.

References

1961 births
Living people
People from San Luis Potosí
National Action Party (Mexico) politicians
21st-century Mexican politicians
Deputies of the LXII Legislature of Mexico
Members of the Chamber of Deputies (Mexico) for Sonora